Ralf Schaffeld (born 13 April 1959) is a retired German football midfielder.

References

External links
 

1959 births
Living people
German footballers
Bundesliga players
VfL Bochum players
Place of birth missing (living people)
Association football midfielders